Mandakini Amte popularly known as Manda Amte is a medical doctor and social worker from Maharashtra, India. She along with her husband, Prakash Amte were awarded the Magsaysay Award for 'Community Leadership' in 2008 for their philanthropic work in the form of the Lok Biradari Prakalp amongst the Madia Gonds in Gadchiroli district of Maharashtra and the neighbouring states of Andhra Pradesh and Madhya Pradesh. She is the daughter-in-law of Baba Amte.

Early life, education and career
Amte was born as Mandakini Deshpande. She had completed her MBBS from Nagpur and later decided to do her post-graduation in Anesthesia in Government Medical College(GMC),Nagpur. Prakash, her future husband, was a surgeon and that's how they met. They worked together in the same operation theatre.

Her father was opposed to her marriage with Prakash Amte as he feared that it meant she would have to live among lepers, which was a taboo then.

Magsaysay award
Amte & her husband were jointly awarded the Magsaysay Award for community leadership in 2008, her citation reads as follows:

Commemorative stamp
The Principality of Monaco brought out a postage stamp in honour of the life and work of Prakash Mandakini in 1995 - just as they had done for Albert Schweitzer in 1955. This was only the second time that the Kingdom of Monaco brought out a stamp to honour a foreigner for their humanitarian work.

A French couple, Guy and Greet Barthelemy, who had worked with Schweitzer in the early fifties, visited the project in 1992. They were moved to see the similarity of conditions at Hemalkasa and those in Africa where Schweitzer worked. This French couple went back and appealed to Prince Rainier III of Monaco to publish a postal stamp to honour the Amtes, which was done in 1995.

References

Indian women activists
Living people
Ramon Magsaysay Award winners
People from Chandrapur district
People from Gadchiroli district
Social workers from Maharashtra
Women educators from Maharashtra
Educators from Maharashtra
Year of birth missing (living people)